Hutton Grammar School is a voluntary aided ie state-funded Church of England comprehensive day school for boys, with a co-educational Sixth Form. It provides education for boys from the age of 11 to 16, and in the Sixth Form (since 1979) for both boys and girls. The school no longer offers boarding. The school is ranked 5th in the league tables in the North-West and 2nd place for AS-A2 results. It was also the Lancashire Rugby School of the Year, for two years running, for 2007 and 2008. Hutton has also achieved Specialist Schools Status accreditation in Mathematics and Computing.

History
The school can trace its antecedents back to 1517, with the school building site being personally approved by Henry VIII in that year. In 1520, the school was granted permission, by William Walton, a former priest of Longton, to all boys in the area. It was William's personal investment, to provide for his family and give the local children a chantry-school to attend.

In 1545, when William Walton, the co-founder of the chantry had died, Henry VIII, near to death, ordered the dissolution of all chantries and the confiscation of their property. The desired building, in Hutton, was, at the time, even though confirmed by Henry VIII, 28 years before, would be demolished if it was reported to be still standing. However, the man appointed to supervise the dissolution of the Lancashire chantries was Sir Henry Farington, a former benefactor of St. Andrews Church in Longton. He falsely reported that he could find no chantries in that part of the county, in order to save the demolition of various buildings in the area.

To avoid suspicion of using a chantry for a school, although the false statement was given, they started to use a small cottage down School Lane, in Longton to educate the local children.

In 1552, William's nephew Christopher Walton of Little Hoole, used a part of the original endowment to found the grammar school, down School Lane in Longton. According to the law at the time, a priest must be in charge of a school, traveling inspectors could have closed it down they saw that a commoner was in charge. Therefore, in 1554, Ralph Garstang, priest of St. Andrews Church, was appointed as the schoolmaster of the school.

For the next few centuries, from 1560 to 1746, it was known as Longton Free School. It was not until 1747 that the roles of schoolmaster and priest were finally disconnected, though many subsequent headmasters were also priests (vide infra). The school was then rebuilt, at Hutton on its present site, built on land that had been a part of William Walton's original grant.  Henceforth, it became known as Hutton Grammar School (often the Free Grammar School according to many references) and, by 1891, it had become an all-boys school. In 1881 there were 22 boarders and 30 day boys, the 1901 census lists 35 boarders, the 1911 census lists 41 boarders. 165 boys were attending the school in 1922. In the 1950s and 1960s, there were 57 boarders in addition to the day boys. The boarding house closed in 1971

The original building, built around 1750 was extended in the late 19th Century. In the early 20th Century there were further extensions and additional buildings were added. In the 1920s a fine headmaster's house was built by Lt Col Reverend Charles P. Hines. A first floor was added to one extension in 1923, such was the demand for extra space. The indoor swimming pool was added by 1935. A large new block was opened in October 1931, consisting of a large assembly hall, 7 classrooms, laboratories and staff facilities, allowing pupil numbers to increase from 121 to 270 boys. This was extended in 1957 with the addition of a larger library, sixth form, chemistry laboratory and classrooms. This allowed 3 form entry and the number of pupils increased to 450, rising to over 500 by 1961. The original 18th Century school building had to be demolished and rebuilt in 1965. Some of the late 19th and early 20th-century buildings are still in use.

The School had an established House System with, by 1957, Breakell-Moss House, Henry Hibbert House, Hines House (to which all boarders belonged), Penwortham House, Rawstorne House and Walton House. The Houses were particularly competitive in inter-house school sports. The House system ceased in 1972.

Although now a comprehensive, the school to this day still retains its grammar school ethos, enabling it to produce results which are amongst the highest in the area. Sports such as rugby and cross-country running play a serious role at Hutton, with Hutton sometimes defeating local independent schools such as Arnold School, Kirkham Grammar School, Rossall School and Stonyhurst College.

List of Headmasters
 1805. Rev Richard Rowe died on 13 June 1805, while headmaster.
 1807. Rev Whitehead.
 1839 to 1851. Rev William Harrison.
 1851. Rev John Ketton, appointed May 1851.
 1861. Rev John Ketton.
 1871. Rev John Ketton.
 1878. Rev Benjamin Corke Huntly M.A. Appointed November 1878, died age 46, while headmaster, on 9 May 1890.
 1891. Rev Thomas Joseph Cunningham M.A.
 1901. Rev Thomas Joseph Cunningham M.A.
 1911. Rev Thomas Joseph Cunningham M.A.
 1920 to 1938. Lieutenant Colonel Reverend Charles P. Hines.
 1938 to 1951. Harold Henry Abbott, the poet.
 1951 to 1963. Charles William Lloyd. Left upon appointment as headmaster at Alleyn's School.
 1963 (Autumn term). Alfred E Ashburner, acting headmaster.
 1964 to 1991. J Nelson.
 1997. Gavin Armstrong.
 2001. T.P. Bennett
 2005. D Pearson, appointed April 2005.
 2016. Mark Bradshaw, appointed April 2016.
 2023. Nicola Moran, appointed January 2023.

Recent Reports
The main school received an Ofsted report in May 2022 and achieved the grade of "good".

Curriculum

Main School
The main school features students from Years 7 to 11. It combines GCSEs through the following subjects: English Language, English Literature, Mathematics, Modern Language, Sciences and Religion, with additional subjects, including History, Geography, Economics, Art, Design, Music and Theatre Arts.

Sixth Form
The school's Sixth form allows students to take a number of the following subjects: English Language & Literature, English Literature, French, German, Spanish, Biology, Chemistry, Physics, History, Geography, Economics, Business Studies, Information Technology, Computing, Religious Studies, Art, Music, Sports, Mathematics, Psychology, Law, General Studies, Drama and Dance.

The Sixth Form is a key part of the school and is a quasi-autonomous body within Hutton Grammar School.

Sports
The school offers more than 15 sports. The main sports at the school are rugby in the winter term and cricket in the summer term.

Former England rugby captain Steve Borthwick attended the school, as did fellow England international Tony Swift,  and leading coach Brian Ashton taught at the school at the start of his coaching career.

Other sports offered include: athletics, Aussie rules, badminton, basketball, chess, cross country running, dance, football, Gaelic football, gymnastics, handball, hockey, swimming, table tennis, tennis, and volleyball.

Facilities
Under headmasters Tom Bennett and David Pearson the school was considerably redeveloped, with facilities such as a new gymnasium and I.T and Mathematics suites installed in 2004. The Music Department now has recording studios and technology suites.

In September 2005, new maths facilities were opened. Following the opening of the new maths suites in the Autumn of 2005, the buildings were used for housing of the resistant materials and art until the end of the academic year of 2006, while the departments were being refurbished.

The old buildings were demolished in the months of July and August 2006 and then in July 2006, the new music and drama suites were opened. Following a large interest in the Sixth Form, due to outstanding results, the Sixth Form was relocated to a new building in September 2010.

Extracurricular activities 
Hutton has many internal and external organisations, one of these being the Old Huttonians Association which is open to all previous attendees of the school. The association organises dinners and reunions on a semi regular basis.

There is also a Masonic Lodge which meets at the school. Old Huttonian Lodge no. 7614 is part of the Leyland Group of Lodges and Chapters and meets 5 times a year. A member of the Federation of School Lodges, it draws membership from current and past teachers, past pupils and their close relatives.

The debating society won the national 'Debating Matters' competition at the Royal Society of Medicine, having never previously entered. The 2015 Hutton debating team won the Lancashire regional heat, which sent them through to the North West & North Wales regional final, which they went on to win. Hutton eventually lost out in the group stages of the national finals in June 2015. However, a year later, the 2016 cohort reached the final of the national finals, finishing runners up. It was the first time Hutton had reached the national finals in consecutive years.

The Hutton Grammar Economics Society is open to all present and past students of the school.

The school had its own radio station, Hutt on Air, which first broadcast on 9 July 2010 and was broadcast to the students (and sixth form) via the school computers and internal AVOID systems.

Notable former pupils

Steve Borthwick, Former England Rugby Union Captain, former Head Coach of Leicester Tigers and now Head Coach of England national rugby union men's team.
Brian Cookson OBE, former President of the International Cycling Union and British Cycling
Peter Elleray, Formula One and 24 Hours of Le Mans Racing car designer.
Edward Gardner, former Royal Navy Commander, survivor of two ship sinkings, barrister and later, a politician
Nigel Jemson, former Premier League footballer
Graham Mather represented Hampshire North and Oxford in the European Parliament from 1994 to 1999
Richard G. Mitchell Composer known for writing and producing movie and TV scores
Nazia Mogra, Children's TV presenter and senior television journalist
Jonathan Myles-Lea, painter
Howard Stableford, former presenter of the BBC's Tomorrow's World and Newsround
Tony Swift, Former England Rugby international
David Williams, Chief Executive of the United Kingdom Space Agency since 2010 (formerly the British Nationals Space Centre)

References

External links
 Hutton Grammar School website
 EduBase
 HGS Economics

1552 establishments in England
Schools in South Ribble
Boys' schools in Lancashire
Secondary schools in Lancashire
Educational institutions established in the 1550s
 
Church of England secondary schools in the Diocese of Blackburn
Voluntary aided schools in England